Babbs may refer to:

Babbs, Oklahoma (Babbs Switch), small rural community in Kiowa County, Oklahoma
Babbs Switch Fire on December 24, 1924, killed thirty-six people in a one-room school house at Babbs Switch
Babbs Green, village in Hertfordshire, England
Babbs Island, island in Hancock County, West Virginia on the Ohio River between East Liverpool, Ohio and Chester, West Virginia
Babbs Mill Lake, man-made lake in the Kingfisher Country Park in the Kingshurst area of Solihull, England
Babbs (surname)

See also
Babb
Babs (disambiguation)